State Route 37 (abbreviated SR 37) is part of Maine's system of numbered state highways, located in the western part of the state. The route is also known as North Bridgton Road. The middle portion of the route is concurrent with SR 35.

Route description
SR 37 begins in the south at the village of North Bridgton, where it splits off from SR 117.  It runs northward, crossing into Waterford in Oxford County, and intersects SR 35 near Bear Lake.  SR 35 and SR 37 are cosigned for  before SR 37 splits off near Keoka Lake, heading east to terminate at SR 118 at the Crooked River.

Junction list

References

External links

Floodgap Roadgap's RoadsAroundME: Maine State Route 37

037
Transportation in Cumberland County, Maine
Transportation in Oxford County, Maine